The Gdańsk tram system is a tram network in Gdańsk, Poland that has been in operation since 1873. The system operates on  track.

Background
The trams are powered using direct current at 600 V.

Network characteristics
The entire network is located within the administrative borders of the city of Gdańsk. The tracks are separated from road traffic at 85% of their length. Most of the network is double track. There are single track sections in the Brzeźno and Nowy Port districts functioning as balloon loops.

The tramway network primarily covers the Dolny Taras and Śródmieście, and also links Wyspa Portowa and Siedlce. In 2007, the network was expanded to Chełm, and in 2012, it was expanded to Łostowice  and Orunia Górna via Ujeścisko. In 2015 trams started running to Piecki-Migowo and Brętowo .

The majority of the lines are located on flat terrain; however, a notable exception is that the line to Chełm is the steepest tram line in Poland. Three tram loops (Jelitkowo, Brzeźno Plaża, and Stogi Plaża) and the Brzeźno terminus are located a few hundred meters from Gdańsk Bay; consequently, the lines experience a lot of tourist traffic.

The tracks run mainly through urbanized areas. An exception to this is the line to Stogi, running through the Las Miejski.
The lines to Chełm have some characteristics of light rail.

The two depots for the trams are located by ulica Stwosza in Strzyży and by the street ulica Władysława IV in Nowy Port. The depots have a capacity of approximately 40% of all the trams.

History

Horsecars

The first horsecar line was launched by the Berlin-founded company "Deutsche Pferdeeisenbahn" on 23 June 1873. It ran from Heumarkt (Targ Sienny) through Langfuhr (modern Wrzeszcz) to Oliva, where the first tram depot was built. After a year, the line between Langfuhr and Oliva was suspended due to competition from rail transport.

After acquiring the company Otto Braunschweig und Oskar Kupferschmidt in 1877, the tramway was expanded:

 From Centrum to Ohra (modern Orunia) (1878)
 From Kohlenmarkt (modern Targ Węglowy), through Langgasse (ulica Długa), Langer Markt (Długi Targ), and Langgarten (modern Długie Ogrody), to Langgarter Tor (modern Brama Żuławska) and Niederstadt (modern Dolne Miasto) (1883)
 From the train station Danzig Petershagen by present-day ulica Toruńska, through Rechtsstadt (modern Główne Miasto), to Fischmarkt (modern Targ Rybny) (1886)
 From Centrum to Schidlitz (modern Siedlce) (1886)

During this time, the following tram depots functioned:
 In Langfuhr near Mirchauer Weg
 Near Weidengasse in Niederstadt
 Wooden halls in Ohra and Schidlitz

Introduction of electric trams

In 1894, the Berlin-founded company AEG acquired "Danziger Strassen Eisenbahn". Subsequently, the company decided to electrify the tramway network. The first regular electric trams were launched on 12 August 1896 on the lines to Orhra and Schidlitz. The first electric tram to Langfuhr was delayed until 28 August 1986 due to problems with infrastructure. All horsecar lines were electrified by the end of the year, and the network was expanded to link the new Main station with Kohlenmarkt. As well, the line from Fischmarkt was expanded to Stadtgraben (Podwale Grodzkie). After all tracks were electrified, AEG conferred the tramway network to the administration of "Allgemeine Strassen und Eisenbahn Gesellschaft".

In 1899 in Neufahrwasser (Nowy Port), a new tramway company was created called "Danziger Elektrische Strassenbahn". In 1900, it opened two lines from Langfuhr to Brösen (modern Brzeźno) and from Brösen through Neufagrwasser to Schichau shipyard. The line headed towards the city center was later expanded to Kassubischer Markt, and subsequently through Pfefferstadt to ulica Szeroka up to the Żuraw. This company had a tram depot near Fischmeisterweg. In 1903, both aforementioned businesses merged to form "Danziger Elektrische Strassenbahn A.G.", headquartered in Langfuhr. In 1904, tracks were built on the Irrgartenbrücke (Błędnik viaduct), linking the tracks on Grosse Allee (Wielka Aleja) with the tracks on Stadtgraben (Podwale Grodzkie). On 18 July 1908, the line from Am Markt (Oliva, modern Stary Rynek Oliwski) through ulica Pomorska to Glettkau (Jelitkowo) was launched.

Trams during World War I
On 1 May 1914, the lines were numbered, replacing the signs marking the terminuses. In February 1917, a lack of coal and spare parts began to cause failures and derailments. A crisis set in in January 1918, and several lines were suspended.

Trams in the Free City of Danzig
Towards the end of 1919, the suspended lines began to be reinstated, and the numbering of some lines was changed. Lines from Promenade were redirected to Stadtgraben, after which the lines to Promenade were scrapped. In 1925, the construction of a line from Centrum to Heubude (modern Stogi) began; it was opened on 4 July 1927. In 1926, tracks on the newly established Paul-Beneke-Weg were opened, scrapping the single rail along Harbour quay. At the time in Neufahrwasser, two balloon loops were constructed; a small loop for the line from Centrum and a larger loop for the line from Brösen. In 1930, a new line from Grosse Allee across Aleja Hallera and ulica Mickiewicza to the loop at the intersection of aleja Legionów and ulica Kościuszki. On the line between Langfuhr and Oliva, the layout was changed, eliminating the line on ulica Szymanowskiego, building it instead on aleja Wojska Polskiego. Construction began for a new tram depot in Langfuhr.

In 1934, pantographs were installed, except on the lines to Schidlitz and Ohra. Plans to extend the line to Bürgerwiesen (Rudnik) were scrapped. In 1935, a new tram depot by ulica Stworsza was built, and the tram depot near Mirchauer Weg was converted into a bus depot.

In 1942, it was planned to eliminate the tram line from Centrum to Schidlitz to replace them with trolleybus lines. However, these plans were never realized. The tramway network functioned normally until 24 March 1945. As a result of shelling from the Soviet army, the powerhouses on Ołowianka were unable to supply adequate power, causing some trams to stop on the streets. During street battles, the tram wagons were used as barricades.

Renovation after 1945

By the end of the Second World War, the tramway powering systems were destroyed, the tracks were seriously damaged from artillery fire, and no tram wagon remained usable. Immediately after the end of military activities in April 1945, the tramway infrastructure began to be rebuilt. As an initiative from the local management board, the Miejski Zakład Komunikacyjny w Gdańsku was formed. Teams of tramway workers from Poznań, Warsaw, and Łódź worked with the tramway workers from Gdańsk to secure and inventory the salvageable materials. Trams and their components were taken from the tram depot in Wrzeszcz, which largely stayed intact. The tram depot by ulica Łąkowa lost its roof from both halls as well as the workshop. On 28 June 1945, rebuilding work for the tramway network recommenced. The repairs were completed in 1947. Almost all lines existing before their destruction were rebuilt. The eliminated tracks were on ulica Szeroka, ulica Kowalska, and ulica Korzenna, as well as a technical track on Stare Przedmieście. A new line to Sopot was launched in 1946.

1947–1989
After the war, tracks located in the densely built city center were eliminated in accordance with the ideology that trams should only run along major thoroughfares.

As a result of the construction of national road 1, new wide streets and tram tracks were built. In 1948 in Oliwa, a new loop was opened near the intersection of aleja Grunwaldzka and ulica Rybińskiego, obviating the loop on Stary Rynek Oliwski. On 1 January 1951, a new company was founded named Wojewódzkie Przedsiębiorstwo Komunikacyjne Gdańsk-Gdynia (WPK G-G).

In 1955, a nightly tramway service was launched. In 1957, the line to Siedlce along ulica Świerczewskiego was made double track. The loop on ulica Bogusławskiego was eliminated, directing the tram from Orunia to the loop on Targ Węglowy instead. A new line was established from ulica Mickiewicza through aleja Marksa to the loop near ulica Kolonia Uroda. In 1960, the track from Kolonia Uroda was extended to Brzeźno, simultaneously eliminating the tracks on ulica Chrobrego and Waryńskiego. The tram ending on ulica Waryńskiego was directed to the loop near the then-airport. In 1961, the line to Sopot was eliminated due to competition from Szybka Koleja Miejska. In the beginning of the 1960s, the loop by ulica Szymanowskiego was eliminated, opening a new loop by ulica Abrahama. In 1968, service recommenced along ulica 3 Maja after 42 years of no service, and construction began of the Błędnik viaduct, which was opened for service on 22 July 1970. In the beginning of the 1970s, the entire track to Siedlce was made double track. On 28 July 1971, the loop by ulica Doka was opened for service, obviating the loop on Targ Węglowy. The tracks on ulica Pomorska were made double track, and the line to Orunia was eliminated.

In 1974, WPK G-G was renamed to Wojewódzkie Przedsiębiorstwo Komunikacyjne w Gdańsku (WPK). In 1974, after the airport in Rębiechowo was opened, construction began for a new line from the loop by ulica Kościuszki to ulica Pomorska in Jelitkowo, during which a large loop was constructed in the Zaspa district. The line was opened on 31 December 1977. On 22 July 1980, new tracks along ulica Kliniczna were opened.

In 1980, a project was launched to expand the tramway network to new neighborhoods on Górski Taras. To this end, it was necessary to build a line to Chełm, however, despite only being 2900 meters long, the line would cover very difficult terrain. Due to technical reasons, and later financial reasons, the project was put off many times and the line was constructed 29 years later.

On 17 December 1981, operations began on the tracks linking aleja Armii Krajowej and ulica 3 Maja, as well as on a new viaduct over railway tracks. A loop on ulica Kliniczna was opened, which allowed the loop on ulica Doka to be eliminated.

1989–2012
In 1989, the company WPK was split, and the counterpart established for Gdańsk was Przedsiębiorstwo Komunikacji Miejskiej, which turned into Gdańsk's budget committee in 1991 under the name of Zakład Komunikacji Miejskiej w Gdańsku (Gdańsk ZKM). In the beginning of the 1990s, a new section on Podwale Przedmiejskie was opened between ulica Chmielna and ulica Łąkowa, in addition to a new bridge for street traffic, which allowed the elimination of the temporary bridge over the Nowa Motława. This line was expanded in 1995 to ulica Siennicka, which allowed the elimination of the line along Długie Ogrody.

In 1997, the Gdańsk ZKM bought two prototype Konstal 114Na vehicles, which featured 15% lower floors. Also in 1997, the idea to expand the tramway network to Chełm resurfaced, so the terrain was studied more carefully. The studies concluded that the trams of the time were inadequate for the projected line; the most serious problem was that the electromagnetic brakes would be unable to maintain the tram's stability in the event of an electrical emergency.

In 1999, the tram depot near ulica Łąkowa in Dolne Miasto was repurposed into a guarded car parking area. Also in this year, the Gdańsk ZKM ordered four Alstrom-Konstal Citadis 100 trams, which featured 70% lower floors. These trams were allocated to line 2 (Centrum-Opera-Zaspa-Jelitkowo).

In 2004, the Gdańsk ZKM was converted into from a budget committee to a limited liability company. In the same year, ulica Łąkowa was isolated from the tramway network and a multiple-stage modernization project of the tramway network called Gdański Projekt Komunikacji Miejskiej was launched.

As a result of the modernization project, construction of the line to Chełm began along aleja Armii Krajowej and aleja Sikorskiego. On 19 December 2007, the line was opened for service. Because the grade of this line was up to 5%, the Konstal 105Na and Konstal 114Na trams could not be used for this line. For the purposes of servicing the Chełm line, 3 Bombardier NGT6 trams were ordered. Because the Konstal 105Na trams were worsening in condition, the Gdańsk ZKM purchased 46 used N8C trams from Dortmund.

In 2009, as a part of the tramway modernization project, a bid was called for 35 one-directional, low-floored, multibody trams from 30 to 35 meters long with a capacity of at least 220 persons. Pesa Bydgoszcz won the call and provided 35 Swing 120NaG trams by the end of 2011.

In May 2010, the renovation and modernization of the tram depot in Wrzeszcz commenced. Because modern trams contain their electrical apparatuses atop their roofs, rather than below the floors, a special system of lifts and platforms was established. A sub-track lathe was installed, allowing all the wheels on a tram to be profiled within two hours without necessitating their removal, and a professional cleaning facility was created. A specialized crane was ordered for the purposes of moving trams across tracks, among other things. More tracks were built and the junctions were renovated. About 30 million zł was allocated for this project. On 30 October 2010, the loop near ulica Abrahama was renamed Stryża in order to match the name of its district.

During the renovation of the tracks in Siedlce, Zaspa, and Przymorze in 2010, the tracks near tram stops were covered in plates or concrete to maintain their cleanliness—the smoother surface is easier to clean.

For New Year's Day 2009-2010, a nightly service was launched for the first time, servicing Chełm – Opera – Zaspa – Oliwa – Wrzeszcz – Opera – Chełm. The current counterpart (Łostowice Świętokrzyska – Chełm – Dworzec Główny – Opera – Zaspa – Oliwa; return via Wrzeszcz) is launched for various festivities (such as "Half price for the weekend," "Museum night," "New Year's") as well as for weekends in summertime.

In 2011, automatic ticket machines began to be installed, making it possible to sell one-time tickets and long-term tickets. The ticket machines were placed near the main stations, transfer points, and on most terminuses.

During construction work on the tracks on Nowy Port, a new junction was built on the route from ulica Wolności to Centrum, allowing Centrum-bound trams to turn about using the "large loop," also allowing the creation of a new line from Brzeźno through Nowy Port to Marynarka Polski. A few years earlier, during a renovation of the tracks in Centrum, a new turn allowed trams to run from Hucisko to Dworzec PKS.

In accordance with construction work called Trasy Słowackiego, a section of the tracks in Brzeźno were modified. Trams from Hallera Avenue used to turn at Gdańska Street, but they no longer pass the intersection of Hallera Avenue, Street Gdańska, and  Chrobrego, instead they turn to a new link between Hallera Avenue and Gdańska street along Uczniowska street. This redirection allowed trams to run on the Nowy Port-Brzeźno Plaża-Gdańska-Nowy Port route.

On 12 May 2012, the track to Chełm was expanded to Łostowice and Orunia Górna via Ujeścisko. A transfer terminal (Łostowice Świętokrzyska) was established between Łostowice and Orunia Górna, with room for 150 cars and a bike park.

After 2012 
On 6 September 2013, a bid was called for the construction of a tram line to PKM Brętowo via Piecki-Migowo. The call for bids was won by MTM (the contractor for the line to Chełm, Orunia Górna, and Łostowice) and Rajbud, which offered an investment of 116.3 million zł. The contract for the implementation of the investment was signed on 12 November 2013, and construction work began. The first tram on the line run on 1 September 2015.

On 30 June 2020, the track to Piecki-Migowo has been extended 2.8 km along Paweł Adamowicz Avenue to Ujeścisko loop at the intersection of streets Warszawska and Jabłoniowa. After financial analysis Gdańsk authorities decided to expand the new tram route along Lavender Hill street ending it near new Elementary School No. 6.

Historical tram depots
 The tram depot by Łąkowa street was closed in 1999, and is now a guarded car parking area.
 The tram depot by aleja Grunwaldzka 527 in Oliwa was the oldest tram depot in Gdańsk. It was turned into a soap factory, then into a tram depot again, and it is now a ruin, having been set on fire several times.
 The technical tram depot in Plac Drogowy was closed in 2004. The tracks in this depot were connected to railway tracks.
 The tram depot by ulica Gościnna in Orunia.
 The tram depot by ulica Partyzantów in Wrzeszcz, later made a bus depot, and converted into a mall in the 1990s.
 The tram depot in Siedlce.

Maps

Tram lines
11 tram lines can function simultaneously in Gdańsk.

Additional lines are activated when necessary.

Rolling stock
, the current fleet consists of:

References

External links

 Lines 
 History
  

Gdansk
600 V DC railway electrification
Gdansk
Transport in Gdańsk